This is a list of the legislative assemblies of Canada's provinces and territories. Each province's legislative assembly, along with the province's lieutenant governor, form the province's legislature (which is called a parliament or general assembly in some provinces). Historically, several provinces had bicameral legislatures, but they all eventually dissolved their upper house or merged it with their lower house.

Current legislative assemblies
Provincial assemblies

Territorial assemblies

Autonomous area assemblies

Gallery

Composition
In the table below, the parties with shading form part of the provincial government whilst the parties in bold have official party status.

Past legislative assemblies

Past assemblies of provinces and territories

*Included some elected members, but did not have responsible government.

* Labrador was added to the name of the province in 2001. Before then, the bodies were the Newfoundland House of Assembly, Lieutenant Governor of Newfoundland, and General Assembly of Newfoundland.

* The territory's name was changed from St. John's Island to Prince Edward Island in 1798. Before then, the bodies were the House of Assembly of the Island of St. John, Legislative Council of the Island of St. John, Lieutenant Governor of the Island of St. John, and General Assembly of the Island of St. John.

Past assemblies of former territories and colonies

Notes

References